Oskar Lory (1 March 1926 – 9 January 1996) was a Swiss bobsledder. He competed in the two-man and the four-man events at the 1964 Winter Olympics.

References

1926 births
1996 deaths
Swiss male bobsledders
Olympic bobsledders of Switzerland
Bobsledders at the 1964 Winter Olympics